Wadgera  is a taluka panchayat in the southern state of Karnataka, India. Administratively, Wadgera is in the Yadgir district in Karnataka. Wadgera is 23 km by road south of the City of Yadgir and 39 km by road southeast of the town of Shahapur. The nearest rail station is Yadgir and the nearest railhead is in Yadgir.

Wadgera is new taluka centre announced in 2017 under congress government.

Demographics
As of 2001 India census, Wadgera had a population of 7,349 with 3,652 males and 3,697 females.

Education
The government pre-university college at wadagera has twice been shifted away to other locales.

Industry
A 20 MW Solar power plant was constructed at wadgera in the 2018 by Mahindra susten pvt ltd. It was owned by Hero future energies ltd.

See also
 Yadgir district
 Districts of Karnataka

References

External links
 

 Villages in Yadgir district
Taluks in Yadgiri district